Panno may refer to:

 James R. Panno (c.1922–1970), member of the Ohio House of Representatives
 Oscar Panno (born 1935), Argentine chess Grandmaster
 Panno (typeface), a Latin sans-serif typeface designed by Pieter van Rosmalen for South Korean road signs